Chai Wan is the eastern terminus of the MTR  on Hong Kong Island, Hong Kong. It is the only station on the Island line that is elevated. The station is located at the junction of Chai Wan Road and Island Eastern Corridor, and it serves Siu Sai Wan and Chai Wan, a primarily residential and industrial town, and the bus terminus nearby has bus and minibus routes to Siu Sai Wan and Stanley, as well as the nearby residential developments.

There were no platform screen doors when this station was opened, but the MTR Corporation has retrofitted automatic platform gates on both platforms in 2011.

History
The station was built on part of Chai Wan Park and the site of a pre-existing minibus terminus. Construction commenced in July 1982 and was carried out by the British contractor George Wimpey. The foundation is formed by hand-dug caissons, while the structure comprises reinforced concrete poured in situ. Over 11,000 cubic metres of concrete was poured.

It opened on 31 May 1985 as part of the first phase of the Island line.

Station layout

Passengers from Chai Wan going to Kennedy Town can board trains on either platforms. The platform from which a train will leave first is indicated on a display board.

An overrun track is present to allow trains to stop and reverse direction if they travel beyond Chai Wan station. However, this set of tracks is rarely used, as trains arriving at Chai Wan station leave for Kennedy Town by pulling out of the same platform.

Entrances and exits
A: New Jade Gardens, Chai Wan Industrial Area, Siu Sai Wan 
B: Cheung Lee Street
C: Public transport interchange
D: Ning Foo Street
E: Hing Wah Estate

References

Chai Wan
Island line (MTR)
MTR stations on Hong Kong Island
Railway stations in Hong Kong opened in 1985
1985 establishments in Hong Kong